Dopalpur is a village in Shaheed Bhagat Singh Nagar district of Punjab State, India. The village is administrated by Sarpanch an elected representative of the village.

Demography 
As of 2011, Dopalpur has a total number of 116 houses and population of 577 of which 280 include are males while 297 are females according to the report published by Census India in 2011. The literacy rate of Dopalpur is 77.31%, higher than the state average of 75.84%. The population of children under the age of 6 years is 57 which is 9.88% of total population of Dopalpur, and child sex ratio is approximately 1280 as compared to Punjab state average of 846.

Most of the people are from Schedule Caste which constitutes 37.09% of total population in Dopalpur. The town does not have any Schedule Tribe population so far.

As per the report published by Census India in 2011, 164 people were engaged in work activities out of the total population of Dopalpur which includes 157 males and 7 females. According to census survey report 2011, 83.54% workers describe their work as main work and 16.46% workers are involved in Marginal activity providing livelihood for less than 6 months.

Education 
The village has a Punjabi medium, co-ed primary school founded in 1974. The schools does not provide mid-day meal. The school provide free education to children between the ages of 6 and 14 as per Right of Children to Free and Compulsory Education Act. KC Engineering College and Doaba Khalsa Trust Group Of Institutions are the nearest colleges.

Transport 

See also 
List of villages in India

References

External links 
 Tourism of Punjab
 Census of Punjab
 Locality Based PINCode

Villages in Shaheed Bhagat Singh Nagar district